Lanarvily is a commune in the Finistère department of Brittany in northwestern France.

Population
Inhabitants of Lanarvily are called  in French Lanarvilisiens.

See also
Communes of the Finistère department

References

External links

Mayors of Finistère Association 

Communes of Finistère